Peppino may refer to:

Given name:

Peppino Spaghetti from Pizza Tower
Peppino D'Agostino, Italian guitarist
Peppino De Filippo (1903–1980), Italian actor
Peppino di Capri (born 1939), Italian popular music singer, songwriter and pianist
Peppino Gagliardi (born 1940), Italian singer
Peppino Tirri (born 1956), Italian football agent registered with the football association of Italy
Peppino Turco (1846–1907), Italian songwriter

Surname:
Franco Peppino, (born 1982), Argentine football player

Films:
Peppino, le modelle e chella là, 1957 comedy film directed by Mario Mattoli and starring Gino Bramieri
Peppino e Violetta, 1950 Italian film directed by Maurice Cloche
Totò, Peppino e la malafemmina ("Totò, Peppino and the bad woman"), Italian comedy film directed by Camillo Mastrocinque in 1956
Toto, Peppino and the Fanatics (Italian: Totò, Peppino e le fanatiche), 1958 comedy film directed by Mario Mattoli and starring Totò

See also
Pepino, an edible fruit 

Italian masculine given names